Spain… on the road Again is a 2008 American food and travel series produced by PBS.  The show features Iron Chef Mario Batali, actress Gwyneth Paltrow, New York Times food writer Mark Bittman, and Spanish actress Claudia Bassols. Each episode covers a different region of Spain as the foursome explore the country's culinary traditions and history.

Before the series premiere on PBS (the week of September 20, 2008), Paltrow and Batali promoted their tour and series on the September 17, 2008 episode of Oprah.

Episode list

Other media 
In October 2008, HarperCollins published a hardcover companion book, Spain… A Culinary Road Trip   written by Batali, Paltrow, and Julia Turshen.

The 13-episode series was released as a 4-disc 16×9 NTSC DVD set  in January 2009.

References

External links 

 

2008 American television series debuts
2008 American television series endings
PBS original programming
Food travelogue television series
Tourism in Spain